Cape Arkona is a rocky headland between the mouths of Lied Glacier and Gotley Glacier on the southwest side of Heard Island in the southern Indian Ocean. The feature appears to be roughly charted on an 1860 sketch map prepared by Captain H.C. Chester, an American sealer operating in the area during this period. In so doing, however, the misspelling "Cape Arcona" was used on the British chart.

Map
Heard Island and McDonald Islands, including all major topographical features

References
 

Headlands of Heard Island and McDonald Islands